The Ministry of Defence of Artsakh is a government agency of the unrecognized Republic of Artsakh. It is the executive body in implementing defence policies of the Artsakh Defence Army. The current minister of defence is Lieutenant General Kamo Vardanyan.

History 
On 26 March 1992, the Defence Committee under the NKR Council of Ministers was established. On the initiative and under the direct leadership of the NKR Defence Committee, a number of very important and urgent events were launched during the First Nagorno-Karabakh War.

Assets

Martik 
Martik is the official newspaper of the Defence Army. The first issue of the newspaper was published on March 16, 1993. It was originally called the "Combat Sheet".  It was created at a time when there were no other sources of information that primarily served to convey frontline information to the public. The first editor of the official newspaper, then called the coordinator, was Valeri Atajanyan. The newspaper was edited by Hrant Aleksanyan, Vahram Atanesyan, Marcel Petrosyan and Mher Harutyunyan at different times.  It is part of the Public Relations Department of the Defence Army. Currently, the editor of "Martik" is Yeraz Harutyunyan. As of 2018, it has issued 4,000 copies.

Goyamart 
The "Goyamart" TV program is a branch of the Defence Army political department that serves as the equivalent to the Armed Forces Network. People such as current National Assembly Deputy Vardges Ulubabyan had a role in its establishment.

Music Units 
Military music in the Defence Army includes a large repertoire of traditional Armenian and foreign music (mainly Russian marching music). Russian marches include Den Pobedy, the March of the Preobrazhensky Regiment, and the Jubilee Slow March "25 Years of the Red Army". The Ministry of Defence maintains a military band that was notably led by Nerik Grigoryan and Vagan Sargsyan and participates in holidays such as the Day of the Artsakh Republic. It was founded in May 1997, by the order of the Chief of Staff of the NKR Self-Defence Committee. It became active by November. It is associated with the Band of the General Staff of the Armed Forces of Armenia.

The army also maintains the Song and Dance Ensemble "Aspet".

List of Ministers 

* Incumbent's time in office last updated: .

See also 
 Armed Forces of Armenia
 Ministry of Defence of Armenia

References 

Executive branch of the government of the Republic of Artsakh
Artsakh
Military of the Republic of Artsakh